The Pittsburgh and Castle Shannon Tunnel, also known as the Mount Washington Coal Tunnel,  was a  narrow-gauge railway tunnel under Mt. Washington.

History

It was originally begun as a coal mine in 1825 by Jacob Beltzhoover.
The mine was extended to the south side of Mount Washington by 1861, and used as part of a system to transport coal from mines along the Saw Mill Run valley to Pittsburgh, connecting with the  Mt. Washington Coal Incline. 
The tunnel provided passenger service beginning in 1874, but this was terminated in 1880, and its passenger duties assumed by the Castle Shannon Incline.
The tunnel was declared unsafe for passenger transport in 1893. However, the tunnel and the Horseshoe Curve continued to be used to transport coal until May 1, 1912.

The southern (Beltzhoover) end of the tunnel temporarily collapsed in a rainstorm in 1901.

References

External links

 Pittsburgh's Forgotten Tunnel

Railroad tunnels in Pennsylvania
Tunnels in Pittsburgh
1825 establishments in Pennsylvania